The  Chū-MAT is a Japanese laser guided anti-tank missile in service with the Japanese Ground Self-Defense Forces. Intended as a front-line replacement for the Type 64 MAT, it has entered into service alongside the SACLOS guided Type 79 Jyu-MAT.

History
Development of the system began in 1976, missile trials were conducted in 1982, and a complete prototype system delivered in 1985. The first units entered service with the JGSDF in 1989. The system consists of a launcher, and a laser designator mounted on a heavy tripod.

Description
The unit is situated on a tripod unit with the missile launcher and laser designator on it. The designator and launcher can be separated from each other by up to 200 meters, or can be mounted together on the same tripod, although Jane's notes that the exhaust gas from the missile may interrupt the designator laser.

Like the Type 64 MAT and the Type 79 Jyu-MAT, it can be mounted onto a Mitsubishi Type 73 jeep or the Komatsu LAV for anti-armor roles.

Future Plans

The Defense Agency's Technical Research and Developmental Institute has begun conducting tests on a new anti-tank missile that will eventually replace the Type 87 in front-line service. The project's code name is known in the JSDF as the Shin Chu-MAT.

See also
 Type 64 MAT
 Type 79 Jyu-MAT
 Type 01 LMAT

References

  Kenkyusha's New Japanese-English Dictionary, Kenkyusha Limited, Tokyo 1991,

External links

 Official JGSDF Page

Anti-tank guided missiles of the Cold War
Post–Cold War anti-tank missiles of Japan
Military equipment introduced in the 1980s